Cedarville is an unincorporated community and census-designated place (CDP) located within Lawrence Township, in Cumberland County, New Jersey, United States. It is part of the Vineland-Millville-Bridgeton Primary Metropolitan Statistical Area for statistical purposes. As of the 2020 United States Census, the CDP's population was 702.

Geography
According to the United States Census Bureau, the CDP had a total area of 2.277 square miles (5.897 km2), including 2.236 square miles (5.791 km2) of land and 0.041 square miles (0.107 km2) of water (1.81%).

Demographics

Census 2010

Census 2000
As of the 2000 United States Census there were 793 people, 276 households, and 208 families living in the CDP. The population density was 134.9/km2 (349.8/mi2). There were 306 housing units at an average density of 52.0/km2 (135.0/mi2). The racial makeup of the CDP was 85.75% White, 8.83% African American, 1.77% Native American, 0.38% Asian, 2.52% from other races, and 0.76% from two or more races. Hispanic or Latino of any race were 4.04% of the population.

There were 276 households, out of which 34.1% had children under the age of 18 living with them, 58.3% were married couples living together, 11.2% had a female householder with no husband present, and 24.3% were non-families. 19.9% of all households were made up of individuals, and 12.3% had someone living alone who was 65 years of age or older. The average household size was 2.87, and the average family size was 3.26.

In the CDP the population was spread out, with 26.9% under the age of 18, 7.7% from 18 to 24, 28.9% from 25 to 44, 23.0% from 45 to 64, and 13.6% who were 65 years of age or older. The median age was 37 years. For every 100 females, there were 99.7 males. For every 100 females age 18 and over, there were 94.6 males.

The median income for a household in the CDP was $46,500, and the median income for a family was $48,021. Males had a median income of $35,833 versus $25,962 for females. The per capita income for the CDP was $15,446. About 2.6% of families and 3.8% of the population were below the poverty line, including 4.6% of those under age 18 and 3.9% of those age 65 or over.

Notable people

People who were born in, residents of, or otherwise closely associated with Cedarville include:
 Mercedes Mota (1880-1964)  educator, writer, developed public education in the Dominican Republic with her sister Antera Mota y Reyes. Attended Pan-American Exposition (Buffalo, NY 1901) as the bearer of a message about  Dominican women. A brief dissertation on the feminine intellectual life in Santo Domingo, and her words aroused great interest. She was only a little over twenty years old. After raising her nieces and nephews in New York City, she lived in Cedarville from the 1940s until her death. 
 Ephraim Bateman (1780-1829) represented New Jersey in the United States Senate from 1826 to 1829 and in the United States House of Representatives from 1815 to 1823.
 Benjamin Franklin Howell (1844-1933) represented New Jersey's 3rd congressional district from 1895 to 1911.
 Samuel Alexander Kinnier Wilson (1878-1937), neurologist who described hepatolenticular degeneration, a copper metabolism disorder affecting the liver and central nervous system, that would later be called Wilson's disease.

References

Lawrence Township, Cumberland County, New Jersey
Census-designated places in Cumberland County, New Jersey